Patricia Lemoine (born 30 December 1961) is a French politician who has been the député for Seine-et-Marne's 5th constituency since 2018.

References 

1961 births
Living people
Agir (France) politicians
Deputies of the 15th National Assembly of the French Fifth Republic
21st-century French women politicians
Women members of the National Assembly (France)
People from Enghien-les-Bains
Politicians from Île-de-France
Deputies of the 16th National Assembly of the French Fifth Republic